Cloud Cuckoo Land is a 2021 historical and speculative fiction novel by Pulitzer-prize winning author Anthony Doerr. It was first published on September 28, 2021, in the United States by Charles Scribner's Sons and the United Kingdom by Fourth Estate. The novel centers around an Ancient Greek codex that links characters from fifteenth-century Constantinople, present-day Idaho, and a twenty-second-century starship.

Plot introduction 
Cloud Cuckoo Land is the story of five characters spanning eight centuries. In the fifteenth-century Byzantine Empire, Anna is a young seamstress living in Constantinople, and Omeir is a village boy conscripted into the Ottoman army, as they are preparing to take the city. In the present day, Zeno, a Korean War veteran, works in a library in Idaho translating Ancient Greek texts, while Seymour, a disturbed autistic youngster, becomes caught up with a group of ecoterrorists. In the twenty-second century, Konstance is a young girl aboard the Argos, a generation starship heading for a planet called Beta Oph2.

Their stories are bound by an Ancient Greek codex entitled Cloud Cuckoo Land that each of the five characters discover and find solace in. It is a fictional book written by real Greek novelist Antonius Diogenes in the second century, and tells the story of Aethon, a shepherd on a quest to find the fabled paradise in the sky. In his travels, he is transformed into a donkey, a sea bass, and finally a crow, which allows him to fly to the gates of the city in the clouds.

Background
Doerr stated in Cloud Cuckoo Land "Author's Note" that his novel draws on several other books, most notably Antonius Diogenes' now-lost "globetrotting tale", Wonders Beyond Thule. The Cloud Cuckoo Land codex is a fictional book-within-a-book that Doerr wrote, but credited it to Diogenes. Ideas for the fable come from The Golden Ass by Apuleius, which Doerr says tells the story of a man turning into a donkey "with far more zest and skill than I do". Many of Zeno's experiences as a prisoner of war in Korea appear in Remembered Prisoners of a Forgotten War: An Oral History of Korean War POWs (2002) by Lewis H. Carlson.

While researching defensive walls for his previous novel All the Light We Cannot See (2014), which centers on the walled city of Saint-Malo, Doerr kept finding references to Constantinople. He said in an interview with Entertainment Weekly that its walls had withstood many sieges, and that it was only when gunpowder appeared in Europe that the Ottomans were able to breach its defenses with cannons in 1453. His fascination with the city's story made him realize that he had to write about it. Doerr said he set part of Cloud Cuckoo Land in the future to show how long ancient texts could survive. He noted that those sections are "not quite science fiction", but added that they were the result of extensive research into what life could be like then. Doerr added that Bill McKibben's book Falter: Has the Human Game Begun to Play Itself Out? (2019) helped him picture what Earth may look like in the twenty-second century.

Reception 
Publishers Weekly, in its starred review, wrote, "Doerr seamlessly shuffles each of these narratives in vignettes that keep the action in full flow and the reader turning the pages. The descriptions of Constantinople, Idaho, and the Argos are each distinct and fully realized, and the protagonists of each are united by a determination to survive and a hunger for stories." Kirkus Reviews agreed, also in a starred review, praising Doerr's many "narrative miracles" for uniting the novel's storylines.

In a review in The Guardian, Elizabeth Knox called Cloud Cuckoo Land "a gift of a novel", that is "large-hearted ... joyous [and] a deep lungful of fresh air". She complimented the skill with which Doerr weaves each of his character's narratives into Diogenes’ fable. Knox stated that Doerr's novel shows "how things survive by chance, and through love" and that love is needed "to save what we still have on Earth". In another review in The Guardian, Hephzibah Anderson wrote that Cloud Cuckoo Land is full of "[w]onderment and despair, love and destruction and hope". With its "lyrical" text and classical philosophy intermingling with the climate crisis, Anderson described the book as "a tribute to the magic of reading".

Marcel Theroux wrote in a review in The New York Times that Cloud Cuckoo Land is "a wildly inventive novel that teems with life, straddles an enormous range of experience and learning, and embodies the storytelling gifts that it celebrates." He said that its characters are "engaging" and the storytelling is "bracing and energetic". He found it "an amazing feat" that Doerr is able to hold together the different narratives, spanning eight centuries, and still produce a "compelling, coherent and moving" book. Theroux concluded that it is "a humane and uplifting book for adults that’s infused with the magic of childhood reading experiences."

In a largely negative review in The Irish Times, Barry Pierce called Doerr's "multi-genre epic" "a convoluted work". He said that while the sections in the present have some of the novel's "strongest plotting and best writing", the Constantinople pieces tend to stagnate, and the time spent aboard the Argos "reads like a literary fiction author attempting to do sci-fi". He also found the short chapters that hop between characters and genres "exhausting" and "the literary equivalent of late-night channel hopping". Pierce concluded that overall, the novel's plot is "technically, masterfully done", and notwithstanding the weaker sections, it keeps moving at a brisk pace, but added that "there may actually be some truth behind the concept of something being too big to fail." Writing in The Washington Post, Ron Charles also called Cloud Cuckoo Land "convoluted". He wrote that while each character's tales could have been a captivating novel (barring the science-fiction story, which he said "has a moldy Twilight Zone funk"), Doerr slices the plots up and scrambles them, creating "a textual puzzle as complicated as the ancient Diogenes codex."

Cloud Cuckoo Land was a finalist for the 2021 National Book Award for Fiction, and was longlisted for the 2021 Andrew Carnegie Medal for Excellence in Fiction.

References

Works cited

Further reading

External links

Cloud Cuckoo Land at FantasticFiction

2021 American novels
2021 science fiction novels
2021 fantasy novels
American historical novels
Charles Scribner's Sons books
Novels set in the Byzantine Empire
Novels set in Istanbul
Novels set in Idaho
Novels set in the 1450s
Novels set in the 1950s
Novels set in the 2020s
Fiction set in 2020
Novels set in the 22nd century
Fiction set in the 2140s
Novels set during the Korean War
Fall of Constantinople
Novels about novels